The Jed Foundation (JED) is a non-profit organization that protects emotional health and prevents suicide for teens and young adults in the United States. 

JED partners with high schools and colleges to strengthen their mental health, substance misuse and suicide prevention programs and systems. They equip teens and young adults with the skills and knowledge to help themselves and each other. They encourage community awareness, understanding and action for young adult mental health.

History

The JED Foundation is rated 4-stars by Charity Navigator, their highest rating.

Campaigns
JED's Mental Health Resource Center: jedfoundation.org/help

The JED website provides information about common emotional health issues and provides guidance for those concerned about themselves or others.

JED Campus: jedcampus.org

A nationwide initiative designed to help colleges and universities develop campus-wide systems, programs and policies to support mental health and prevent substance abuse and suicide. Following JED’s Comprehensive Approach, JED Campuses embark on a multi-year strategic partnership with JED to build a safety net for their students. The JED Campus program involves nearly 170 campuses.

Set to Go: settogo.org

A new program that guides students, families and high school educators through the social, emotional and mental health challenges related to the transition out of high school to college and adulthood. Set to Go currently features a Transition of Care Guide, Right Fit Worksheet and other tools for students and families.

ULifeline: ulifeline.org

A mental health resource center for college students that provides information about emotional health issues and the resources available on their campus. It also offers a confidential mental health self-screening tool. Over 1,600 colleges and universities are registered on ULifeline.

Half of Us: halfofus.com

An award-winning program from JED & MTV featuring a library of free-for-use videos including PSAs, celebrities and students talking about their personal experiences with mental health and substance use. Half of Us helps young people feel less alone and encourages them to reach out for help.

Love Is Louder: loveislouder.com

A community-oriented site offering advice, support, and information on well-being and self-care. Co-founded by actress and singer Brittany Snow. 

JED also partners with a number of organizations on educational and awareness campaigns and projects and creates guides and tools for professionals, parents and students.

Seize The Awkward: seizetheawkward.org

A national campaign in partnership with Ad Council and American Foundation for Suicide Prevention that encourages teens and young adults to "seize the awkward" by reaching out to a friend who may be struggling with mental health problems.

References

External links
 The Jed Foundation - Official site
 JED Campus
 Set to Go
 ULifeline
 Half of Us
 Love is Louder

Non-profit organizations based in New York City
Suicide prevention
Organizations established in 2000
2000 establishments in the United States